Infant mental health is the study of mental health as it applies to infants, toddlers, and their families.  The field investigates optimal social and emotional development of infants and their families in the first three years of life. Cognitive development, and the development of motor skills may also be considered part of the infant mental health picture. While the interest in the mental life of infants in the context of their early relationships can be traced back to the work of Anna Freud, John Bowlby, and Donald Winnicott in Great Britain, infant mental health as a movement of public health policy, empirical research (i.e. baby-watching), and change in clinical practice paralleled both that of the women's movement and of increased awareness of the prevalence and consequences of child abuse and neglect during the 1960s and 1970s.  The vast literature that has emerged since the field's origins has been reviewed in several key texts. Basic principles of infant mental health evaluation and treatment involve consideration of at least three patients: parent(s), child, and their relationship, while keeping in mind the rapid and formative development of the brain and mind in the first years of life.

Organizations
Worldwide, the World Association for Infant Mental Health (WAIMH) and its affiliates are active in addressing infant mental health concerns, and work toward ongoing scientific and clinical study of the infant's development and its impact on later development. The WAIMH organizes a world congress in even years.

In the United States, the organization Zero-to-Three: National Center for Infants, Toddlers, and Families also plays an important role in research and advocacy for infants and toddlers. Zero-to-Three was responsible for creating the Diagnostic Classification: 0-3 (DC:0-3), the revised version (DC:0-3R), and in 2016 the DC:0-5 that allows mental health professionals to give a mental health diagnosis to infants, toddlers, and their relationships with their caregivers when suffering and dysfunction reach a level suggestive of psychopathology that requires intervention. Both Zero-to-Three and WAIMH cite empirical research in advocating the assessment and treatment of psychiatric issues in pre-verbal children. Several states have infant mental health organizations affiliated with WAIMH and Zero-to-Three.

These organizations publish newsletters and journals such as "Zero to Three" and organize conferences and training events for individuals working with young children and their families.

The "Infant Mental Health Journal" is published by Wiley and owned by the Michigan Association for Infant Mental Health.

Infant mental health most often implies interdisciplinary practice that began with the work of Selma Fraiberg and her article "Ghosts in the Nursery" among other key figures.  Infant mental health practitioners provide relationship-focused interventions to parents, foster parents, and other primary caregivers together with their infants and toddlers.  Support and mental health care when indicated is offered to help the parents engage with their infants and toddlers and to better understand the unresolved losses from their past in order to be more emotionally available to them.  One chief goal of infant mental health intervention is to attain a more satisfying relationship between the parent(s) and infant/toddler as well as greater attachment security.

See also
 Attachment theory
 Child abuse
 Child sexual abuse
 Child welfare

References

External links
 Zero to Three
 World Association for Infant Mental Health (WAIMH)
 "Infant Mental Health Journal"

Mental health
Infancy
Pathology of pregnancy, childbirth and the puerperium